Lieutenant-General Sir William Pitcairn Campbell (or Pitcairn-Campbell),  (20 June 1856 – 22 September 1933) was a British Army General during the First World War.

Early life 
He was the son of James Pitcairn Campbell and his wife, Eleanor (née Eyre), of Burton Hall, Neston. He had two elder sisters, Eliza and Georgina. He was educated at Windlesham House School, Eton College and the Royal Military College, Sandhurst.

Military career 
William Campbell was commissioned into the King's Royal Rifle Corps in 1875. He served with the Mounted Infantry Camel Corps in Sudan between 1884 and 1885. His battalion served in South Africa between 1899 and 1901 during the Second Boer War. At the Battle of Talana Hill he was wounded and his commanding officer was killed. As second in command, he took command of his battalion and was part of the garrison besieged at Ladysmith. He was subsequently promoted to Lieutenant-Colonel in command of the 1st Battalion on 25 January 1900.

He was Aide-de-camp to King Edward VII from 1900 to 1907 and was made a Companion of the Order of the Bath in the King's Birthday Honours of 1906. 

He was appointed Commander 3rd Brigade in 1904 and General Officer Commanding 5th Division in 1909. He moved on to be General Officer Commanding-in-Chief of Southern Command from 1914 and General Officer Commanding-in-Chief of Western Command from 1916; he retired in 1918.

He received his knighthood in 1915 through promotion to Knight Commander in the Order of the Bath.

In 1916, he was appointed Colonel of the Highland Light Infantry, succeeding General Sir Henry Hildyard.

Family
In 1888 a fellow infantry officer, Major Gilbert, who had been serving in India named him as co-respondent in the divorce case against his wife. The following year, he and Edith Gilbert (née Prothero) married and went on to have one daughter.

References

|-
 

|-
 

1856 births
1933 deaths
British Army lieutenant generals
Knights Commander of the Order of the Bath
British Army generals of World War I
King's Royal Rifle Corps officers
British Army personnel of the Mahdist War
British Army personnel of the Second Boer War
People educated at Windlesham House School